L'Écaille is a commune in the Ardennes department in the Grand Est region in northern France.

Population

See also
Communes of the Ardennes department

References

Communes of Ardennes (department)
Ardennes communes articles needing translation from French Wikipedia